Alma M. Grocki is a retired United States Navy rear admiral. After graduating from the United States Naval Academy in 1981, she served in a succession of warship and submarine maintenance postings before transferring to the United States Navy Reserve in 1988. Grocki commanded various U.S. Navy facilities, shipyards and programs before becoming director of fleet maintenance for the United States Pacific Fleet and deputy commander of Naval Sea Systems Command.

Grocki retired in October 2016, at which point she was the senior engineering duty officer (EDO) in the U.S. Navy Reserve. She played a key role in the creation of insignia for EDO role, which was authorized for wear in January 2018. In her civilian career she has worked for CACI Dynamic Systems and also serves voluntarily as a blue and gold officer for the Naval Academy.

U.S. Navy career 
Born in Honolulu, Hawaii, as Alma Lau, Grocki attended the privately-run Punahou School where she was two years ahead of future U.S. President Barack Obama. Her father was a civil service employee and General Foreman for 39 years, working on submarine maintenance at the Pearl Harbor shipyard. Grocki joined the United States Naval Academy's second class of women in 1977 and was the first woman from her state to enter the academy. She states that a good sense of humor and relying on friends and classmates as well as liberal amount of "aloha spirit" helped her through the Academy. She graduated from the Academy in 1981 with a Bachelor of Science degree.

At Portsmouth she served in the same role for the experimental submarine NR-1 and completed a Master of Science degree in mechanical engineering at the nearby University of New Hampshire. Grocki returned to her home state to serve as billeting officer at Naval Station Pearl Harbor. She later served at the station's shipyard and in 1985 was admitted as an engineering duty officer (EDO). At Pearl Harbor she was ship superintendent and senior ship superintendent for several warships and submarines.

Navy Reserve 

Grocki transferred to the US Navy Reserve in 1988. She served as commanding officer of shore maintenance facilities in Portsmouth and at Naval Station Everett and of the Navy Reserve shipyard at Puget Sound Naval Shipyard and Intermediate Maintenance Facility. She also commanded the Navy Reserve Naval Submarine Support Command, Pearl Harbor; Naval Undersea Warfare Command, Keyport, Washington; and Naval Sea Systems Command (NAVSEA) 102 at Bremerton, Washington. Grocki was the first national director of the Navy Reserve's SurgeMain shipyard workforce recruitment programme and served as commanding officer of the NAVSEA headquarters unit and as chief of staff for its naval reactors division.

Grocki later served on active duty as deputy operations officer of the Pearl Harbor Naval Shipyard and director of submarine maintenance for the US Pacific Fleet. She was later recalled to active duty to director of fleet maintenance for the Pacific Fleet and was deputy commander of Naval Sea Systems Command. Grocki was awarded the Legion of Merit three times, the Meritorious Service Medal five times and the Navy and Marine Corps Commendation Medal four times in the course of her navy career.

Civilian career and personal life 

Grocki retired in October 2016, at which point she was the senior EDO in the Navy Reserve. She played a key role in the creation of the breast insignia for the EDO role which was authorised for wear in January 2018.

During her civilian career she has worked for CACI Dynamic Systems to provide shipyard training, audits of NAVSEA dry docks and in the provision of fleet maintenance information technology programs. She is a Blue and Gold Officer (BGO) (volunteer admissions counselor) for the United States Naval Academy and co-ordinates the academy's BGO operations in the Western Pacific, including applicants from high schools and within the Fleet and Marine Corps. She also worked on the U.S. Navy's commemoration of the 75th anniversary of the attack on Pearl Harbor, the 50th Commemoration of the Vietnam War, and Veterans Day 2017.

Alma married Russ Grocki in 1992. The couple had been in the same company at the U.S. Naval Academy and were friends, but did not date, and after graduation, did not meet again until 1991. Russ was a nuclear submarine officer and reconnected with Alma when stationed at Vallejo in California. He was the Commanding Officer of USS Cavalla (SSN 684). They have two sons, Dan and Nick. Russ had to return to sea as Executive Officer of the missile ballistic submarine USS Alaska (SSN 732) for a six month deployment three weeks after the birth of Nick, so Alma played daily videos of Russ so that Nick would become familiar with his dad's face and voice. Alma lives in Hawaii with her husband, who retired in 2011. Dan and Nick followed in their parents' footsteps, with Dan graduating from the U.S. Naval Academy in 2016 and reporting aboard his submarine, USS Connecticut (SSN 21), and Nick graduating in 2018 from the Reserve Officers' Training Corps program at Renssalaer Polytechnic Institute and reporting as a Navy engineer to Naval Reactors.

References

External links

United States Naval Academy alumni
University of New Hampshire alumni
Female admirals of the United States Navy
People from Honolulu
Military personnel from Hawaii
Recipients of the Legion of Merit
Living people
Year of birth missing (living people)
21st-century American women